Radio One (also known simply as "The One") is a student radio station operating from the University of Otago in Dunedin, New Zealand. It broadcasts on a frequency of 91.0 MHz. it is a member of the Student Radio Network group of stations, all of which are run from New Zealand University campuses.

The impetus for the station began with an open letter to the President of the Otago University Students' Association (then Phyllis Comerford) from Alastair Thomson, who had worked on the Waikato University student radio station. This letter brought together other interested parties including members of the bands Netherworld Dancing Toys and The Verlaines:Graham Cockroft was the first station manager. With a grant from the OUSA of approximately $12,000, the station first went to air in early 1984 broadcasting from the OUSA's former boardroom. The station initially ran on a part-time basis during the university year until the 1986 when it started operating round-the-clock throughout the year. In 1987 Radio 1 shifted into a new annex to the Student Union building which was specifically designed to house the station, the OUSA's offices, and the university's student newspaper Critic. The station celebrated its 25th birthday at the beginning of 2009.

In the station's early years, its 100 Watt transmitter was located on the top of the campus's tallest building (the 11-storey Richardson Building, then known as the Hocken Building), but since the 1987 it has had a transmitter on the top of Mount Cargill, 12 kilometres north of the campus. This gives the station a range which covers much of coastal Otago, from Oamaru to past Balclutha.

The changes to become a year-round station operating from purpose built facilities and expanded coverage were undertaken by the 1986 station manager Chris Lambourne.

Radio One can now be heard anywhere in the world as it streams all content in 128 kbit/s stereo mp3 over the internet.

The station is run largely by volunteer announcers, with a small paid staff. It runs a wide variety of general interest and specialist shows, many of them catering for audiences not covered by Dunedin's other radio stations, such as The Local which plays only New Zealand content and Overgrown which is New Zealand's only Cannabis Law Reform themed radio show.

The Onecard scheme
In 1986, the station launched an innovative scheme to raise money to support the station - a loyalty card called "The Rad-one Card" (more recently just "The Onecard"). This gave subscribers ("Rad-ones") the opportunity to gain discounts at local stores and events, and to enter on-air competitions in return for a small annual fee. The scheme has been widely adopted by other student radio stations around New Zealand.

Notable former and current staff
Shayne Carter
Wallace Chapman
Charlotte Glennie
Sam Hayes
Aaron Hawkins
Sean Norling
Jan Hellriegel
Lesley Paris
David Pine
Bonnie "Boomfa" Harrison
Henessey Griffiths
Tom "Cheese Touch" Tremewan
Charlie "The" Dog
 Dave Borrie
Jamie Green
Quintin Jane

External links

References

Student radio stations in New Zealand
University of Otago
Radio stations in Dunedin